In computer science and numerical analysis, unit in the last place or unit of least precision (ulp) is the spacing between two consecutive floating-point numbers, i.e., the value the least significant digit (rightmost digit) represents if it is 1. It is used as a measure of accuracy in numeric calculations.

Definition
One definition is: In radix  with precision , if , then 

These definitions differ only at signed powers of the radix.

The IEEE 754 specification—followed by all modern floating-point hardware—requires that the result of an elementary arithmetic operation (addition, subtraction, multiplication, division, and square root since 1985, and FMA since 2008) be correctly rounded, which implies that in rounding to nearest, the rounded result is within 0.5 ulp of the mathematically exact result, using John Harrison's definition; conversely, this property implies that the distance between the rounded result and the mathematically exact result is minimized (but for the halfway cases, it is satisfied by two consecutive floating-point numbers). Reputable numeric libraries compute the basic transcendental functions to between 0.5 and about 1 ulp. Only a few libraries compute them within 0.5 ulp, this problem being complex due to the Table-maker's dilemma.

Examples

Example 1
Let  be a positive floating-point number and assume that the active rounding mode is round to nearest, ties to even, denoted . If , then . This is demonstrated in the following Haskell code typed at an interactive prompt:

> until (\x -> x == x+1) (+1) 0 :: Float
1.6777216e7
> it-1
1.6777215e7
> it+1
1.6777216e7

Here we start with 0 in single precision and repeatedly add 1 until the operation does not change the value. Since the significand for a single-precision number contains 24 bits, the first integer that is not exactly representable is 224+1, and this value rounds to 224 in round to nearest, ties to even. Thus the result is equal to 224.

Example 2
The following example in Java approximates  as a floating point value by finding the two double values bracketing : .
// π with 20 decimal digits
BigDecimal π = new BigDecimal("3.14159265358979323846");

// truncate to a double floating point
double p0 = π.doubleValue();
// -> 3.141592653589793  (hex: 0x1.921fb54442d18p1)

// p0 is smaller than π, so find next number representable as double
double p1 = Math.nextUp(p0);
// -> 3.1415926535897936 (hex: 0x1.921fb54442d19p1)

// ulp(π) is the difference between p1 and p0
BigDecimal ulp = new BigDecimal(p1).subtract(new BigDecimal(p0));
// -> 4.44089209850062616169452667236328125E-16
// (this is precisely 2**(-51))

// same result when using the standard library function
double ulpMath = Math.ulp(p0);
// -> 4.440892098500626E-16 (hex: 0x1.0p-51)

Example 3

Another example, in Python, also typed at an interactive prompt, is:

>>> x = 1.0
>>> p = 0
>>> while x != x + 1:
...   x = x * 2
...   p = p + 1
... 
>>> x
9007199254740992.0
>>> p
53
>>> x + 2 + 1
9007199254740996.0

In this case, we start with x = 1 and repeatedly double it until x = x + 1. Similarly to Example 1, the result is 253 because the double-precision floating-point format uses a 53-bit significand.

Language support
The Boost C++ libraries provides the functions boost::math::float_next, boost::math::float_prior, boost::math::nextafter 
and boost::math::float_advance to obtain nearby (and distant) floating-point values, and boost::math::float_distance(a, b) to calculate the floating-point distance between two doubles.

The C language library provides functions to calculate the next floating-point number in some given direction: nextafterf and nexttowardf for float, nextafter and nexttoward for double, nextafterl and nexttowardl for long double, declared in <math.h>. It also provides the macros FLT_EPSILON, DBL_EPSILON, LDBL_EPSILON, which represent the positive difference between 1.0 and the next greater representable number in the corresponding type (i.e. the ulp of one).

They were introduced with Java 1.5.

The Swift standard library provides access to the next floating-point number in some given direction via the instance properties nextDown and nextUp. It also provides the instance property ulp and the type property ulpOfOne (which corresponds to C macros like FLT_EPSILON) for Swift's floating-point types.

See also
 IEEE 754
 ISO/IEC 10967, part 1 requires an ulp function
 Least significant bit (LSB)
 Machine epsilon

References

Bibliography

Goldberg, David (1991–03). "Rounding Error" in "What Every Computer Scientist Should Know About Floating-Point Arithmetic". Computing Surveys, ACM, March 1991. Retrieved from http://docs.oracle.com/cd/E19957-01/806-3568/ncg_goldberg.html#689.

Computer arithmetic
Floating point